B.P.R.D. Hell on Earth: New World is the first trade paperback collection in the Hell on Earth cycle of the B.P.R.D. series.

Story

Chapter 1

Chapter 2

Chapter 3

Chapter 4

Chapter 5

Seattle

References

Fantasy comics